Giuseppe Bausilio (born June 20, 1997) is a Swiss actor, dancer, and singer.  Bausilio is known for his theater roles, such portrayal of "Billy" in the Broadway, Chicago, and National Tour productions of Billy Elliot the Musical, as well as his performances as "Race" and "Davey" in the Broadway production of Newsies the Musical. He also starred as Alfie in fourth season of the Canadian television series The Next Step, and as Michael Fiorelli in the 2020 film Ode to Passion.

Career
Bausilio began his professional career performing in multiple operas and ballets at the Bern Theatre and Theater im Kafigturm in his hometown of Bern, Switzerland.

After placing third in a dance competition, Bausilio was invited to audition for the part of "Billy" in Billy Elliot the Musical. After the audition he was cast in the Chicago production of the show along with Cesar Corrales, Tommy Batchelor and J.P. Viernes. He remained with the production through October 10, 2010, at which time he joined the National Tour production of the show.

In May 2011, Bausilio was announced as the next "Billy" in the Broadway production of Billy Elliot the Musical replacing the departing Jacob Clemente. Bausilio made his Broadway Debut that July, and remained with the show through November 6, 2011. Bausilio began performances as "Race" in Newsies on October 7, 2013. Giuseppe starred as Alfie in fourth season of the Canadian drama television series The Next Step.

He recently starred in the lead role of Michael Fiorelli in the independent musical feature film Ode to Passion, which was released exclusively on Amazon Prime Video on July 10, 2020.

Stage

Filmography

Awards
 Jazz Competition Bern, CH 1st Place
 Ravenna Youth America Grand Prix World Ballet Competition 2nd Place (2008) 
 Youth America Grand Prix (World Dance Competition) 3rd Place (2009) 
 Concour Le Chausson (Paris Dance Competition), 1st Place (2009) 
 MAB, Maria Antonietta Berlusconi International Balllet Award, 1st Place (2010), Milano Teatro Manzoni
 New York Final Youth American Grand Prix World Ballet Competition 3rd Place (2011)
 Youth America Grand Prix (World Dance Competition) 3rd Place (2011)
 Youth America Grand Prix (World Dance Competition) 2nd Place (2012)
 Competition in "LES CHAUSSON D’OR" 2nd Place (2012) (Paris, FR)

References

External links
 Official Website
 
 

Living people
Swiss expatriates in Canada
Swiss male ballet dancers
1997 births
21st-century Swiss male actors
People from Bern